Minuscule 483 (in the Gregory-Aland numbering), ε 376 (in the Soden numbering), is a Greek minuscule manuscript of the New Testament, on parchment. It is dated by a colophon to the year 1285 (altered to 985). 
It contains liturgical books with hagiographies: Synaxarion and Menologion. Scrivener labelled it by number 543. The manuscript has complex contents.

Description 

The codex contains the text of the New Testament except Book of Revelation on 360 parchment leaves. It is written in one column per page, 22-23 lines per page.

The text of the Gospels is also divided according to the Ammonian Sections.

It has many corrections made by two hands.

Text 

The Greek text of the codex is a representative of the Byzantine text-type. Aland placed it in Category V.
According to Scrivener it is different from codex 484 – both written by the same scribe – only in 183 places (errors of itacism excluded).

According to Claremont Profile Method it represents the textual family Family Kx in Luke 1, Luke 10, and Luke 20. It belongs to the textual cluster 74. In Luke 20 it was corrected to Family Kr.

It has many changes made in the text. The corrected text in Luke represents the textual family Family Kr.

History 

The manuscript was written by Theodorus Hagiopetrita (as Minuscule 74, 484) in 1295 CE. It once belonged to Caesar de Missy, then to Duke's Sussex library. In 1845 it belonged to the Wm. Pickering, the bookseller. Scrivener in 1894 noticed "its present locality is unknown". The same wrote Gregory in 1900: "Heute verschollen". It was found later in U.S.A.

The manuscript was examined and collated by Scrivener, who published its text in 1852. It was added to the list of New Testament manuscripts by Scrivener (543) and Gregory (483).

Currently it is housed at the Williams College (Chapin Libr., Cod. De Ricci, no. 1) in Williamstown, Massachusetts.

See also 

 List of New Testament minuscules
 Biblical manuscript
 Textual criticism

References

Further reading 

 F. H. A. Scrivener, A Full and Exact Collation of About 20 Greek Manuscripts of the Holy Gospels (Cambridge and London, 1852), p. LI. (as q)
 F. H. A. Scrivener, An Exact Transcript of the Codex Augiensis (Cambridge and London, 1859), p. 63. (as f)
 K. W. Clark, A Descriptive Catalogue of Greek New Testament Manuscripts in America (Chicago, 1936), pp. 17–20.

Greek New Testament minuscules
13th-century biblical manuscripts